Rundu Chiefs FC is a Namibian football club from Rundu. They play in the country's highest division, the Namibia Premier League.

The team was founded in 1976.

League participations
Namibia Premier League: 2012–14; 2015–
Namibia First Division: ????; 2008–11; 2014–15

Stadium
Currently the team plays at the 500 capacity Rundu Stadium.

References

External links
 Soccerway

1976 establishments in South West Africa
Association football clubs established in 1976
Football clubs in Namibia
Namibia Premier League clubs
Rundu